Aichstetten is a municipality in the district of Ravensburg in Baden-Württemberg in Germany.

Transportation

Aichstetten is served by the Leutkirch-Memmingen railway.

References

Ravensburg (district)